The electoral district of Kororoit is an electorate of the Victorian Legislative Assembly covering Albanvale, Caroline Springs as well as some parts of Deer Park and St Albans in the western suburbs of Melbourne.

The seat was created prior to the 2002 election and with the same redistribution turning Labor Party powerbroker and cabinet minister Andre Haermeyer's seat of Yan Yean into a marginal Liberal seat, Haermeyer decided to contest Kororoit. He won the seat with a margin of 27.1% making it the fourth-safest Labor seat in the state.

The seat is currently held by Luba Grigorovitch, who was elected at the 2022 Victorian state election following the retirement of Marlene Kairouz.

Members for Kororoit

Election results

References

External links
https://www.vec.vic.gov.au/electoral-boundaries/state-districts/kororoit-district Electorate profile: Kororoit, Victorian Electoral Commission] 

2002 establishments in Australia
Electoral districts of Victoria (Australia)
City of Melton
City of Brimbank
Electoral districts and divisions of Greater Melbourne